LP5 is the fifth studio album by American musician John Moreland. It was released on February 7, 2020 under Old Omens.

Critical reception
LP5 was met with generally favorable reviews from critics. At Metacritic, which assigns a weighted average rating out of 100 to reviews from mainstream publications, this release received an average score of 77, based on 9 reviews.

Track listing

Charts

References

2020 albums